A trance is an altered state of consciousness.

Trance may also refer to:

Film and television 
 Trance, or Anita, a 1920 Austrian film directed by Luise Fleck
 Der Fan, a 1982 West German horror film also known as Trance
 Trance (1998 film), an American horror film by Michael Almereyda
 Trance (2013 film), a British thriller directed by Danny Boyle
 Trance (2020 film), an Indian Malayalam-language film
 "The Trance" (The Twilight Zone), an episode of The Twilight Zone
 Trance Gemini, a fictional character in the TV series Andromeda

Literature 
 Trance (comics), a fictional character in the Marvel Comics universe
 Trance, a 2006 novel by Stanley Morgan
 Trance, a 2005 novel by Christopher Sorrentino
 Trance, a play by Shoji Kokami

Music 
 Trance music, a type of electronic dance music with several subgenres
Trance (band), German heavy metal band

Albums 
 The Trance (album), a 1965 album by Booker Ervin
 Trances (album), a 1983 album by Robert Rich
 Trance (Steve Kuhn album), 1975
 Trance, a 1982 album by Chris & Cosey
 Trance (EP), a 1998 EP by Virgin Black
 Trance (Hassan Hakmoun album), 1993

Songs 
 "Trance (Make My Own Reality)", a 2008 song by Doug Wimbish from the album CinemaSonics

Other uses 
 TRANCE (TNF-related activation-induced cytokine) or RANKL, a human protein
 Trance JIT, a MorphOS just-in-time compiler for running 68k applications
 Trance, a fictional attribute in the video game Final Fantasy IX

sv:Trance